|}

The 52nd Kerala State Film Awards, presented by the Kerala State Chalachitra Academy were announced by the Minister for Cultural Affairs, Saji Cheriyan in Thiruvananthapuram on 27 May 2022. A total of 142 films competed for the awards.

Writing category

Awards
All award recipients receive a cash prize, certificate and statuette.

Jury Mention
All recipients receive a certificate and statuette.

Film category

Jury

Awards
All award recipients receive a cash prize, certificate and statuette.

Special Jury Mention
All recipients receive a certificate and statuette.

Special Award in Any Category for Women/Transgender
All recipients receive a certificate and statuette.

References

External links 
https://www.keralafilm.com

Kerala State Film Awards
2020 Indian film awards
2022 Indian film awards